Melody of Fate is a 1950 West German drama film directed by Hans Schweikart and starring Brigitte Horney, Viktor de Kowa and Mathias Wieman. It was shot at the Tempelhof Studios in Berlin. The film's sets were designed by the art director Franz Schroedter.

Synopsis
A love triangle develops between the wife of a composer and a celebrated conductor.

Cast
 Brigitte Horney as Carola
 Viktor de Kowa as Ewald Bergius
 Mathias Wieman as Martin Ehrling
 Fita Benkhoff as Betty Müller
 Maria Litto as Lill aus der Colombo-Bar
 Otto Gebühr as Professor Ahrens
 Franz Schafheitlin as Hugo Müller
 Friedrich Joloff as Amerikaner in der Colombo-Bar
 Reinhard Kolldehoff
 Herbert B. Tenbrook
 Erich Dunskus
 Paul Gunther
 Peter Petersz
 Ilka Hugo
 Paul Mederow

References

Bibliography
 Bock, Hans-Michael & Bergfelder, Tim. The Concise CineGraph. Encyclopedia of German Cinema. Berghahn Books, 2009.

External links 
 

1950 films
1950 drama films
German drama films
West German films
1950s German-language films
Films directed by Hans Schweikart
Films about classical music and musicians
Adultery in films
Films shot at Tempelhof Studios
German black-and-white films
1950s German films